Bucium is a commune located in Alba County, Transylvania, Romania. It has a population of 1,454. It is composed of thirty villages: Anghelești, Bisericani, Bucium, Bucium-Sat (Bucsum-Szát), Cerbu (Bucsum-Cserbu), Ciuculești, Coleșeni, Dogărești, Ferești, Florești, Gura Izbitei, Helești, Izbicioara, Izbita (Bucsum-Izbita), Jurcuiești, Lupulești, Măgura, Muntari (Bucsum-Muntár), Petreni, Poiana, Poieni (Bucsum-Pojén), Stâlnișoara, Vâlcea, Valea Abruzel, Valea Albă, Valea Cerbului, Valea Negrilesii, Valea Poienii, Valea Șesii and Văleni. 

On its territory can be found a Roman castrum, as well as the ancient open-pit mining sites at Ieruga and Gaura Perii. The Bucium gold deposits are located within the northernmost volcanic belt of the "Golden Quadrilateral," near the Roșia Montană mining town.

The physicist Ion I. Agârbiceanu was a native of Bucium. His father, the writer Ion Agârbiceanu, served as Greek-Catholic parish priest at the church in Bucium–Șasa village (now Ciuculești).

In Béla Bartók's Romanian Folk Dances, the fourth dance is called "Buciumeana", meaning a dance from Bucium.

References

Communes in Alba County
Localities in Transylvania
Mining communities in Romania